Artur Żurawski (born 1972) is a Polish cinematographer, director and photographer who works in Poland and internationally.

A native of the Baltic port city of Szczecin, he is a graduate of the Academy of Visual Arts in Poznań and the National Film School in Łódź.

In 2014, he was the director of photography on the Indian crime thriller Mardaani, directed by Pradeep Sarkar, produced by Aditya Chopra, with Bollywood star Rani Mukerji in the leading role. In January 2015, the film premiered in the Polish capital, Warsaw, at one of Poland's oldest art houses, Kino Muranów, with Rani Mukerji and Artur Żurawski participating in a question-and-answer session after the screening.

Filmography

References

External links

1972 births
Living people
21st-century Polish cinematographers
Polish film directors
Łódź Film School alumni
Film people from Szczecin
Date of birth missing (living people)